The Duane's Hangar Ultrababy (sometimes Ultra Baby) is an American homebuilt aircraft that was designed by Duane Patrick and produced by Duane's Hangar of Liberty, South Carolina, introduced about 1997. When it was available the aircraft was supplied in the form of plans for amateur construction.

Design and development
It can have a sufficiently low enough empty weight for that category when a light enough engine is fitted. The Ultrababy can also be registered in the American homebuilt aircraft category.

The Ultrababy features a wire-braced low-wing, a single-seat open cockpit with a windshield, fixed conventional landing gear and a single engine in tractor configuration.

The aircraft is made from wood, with its flying surfaces covered in doped aircraft fabric.

The designer estimates the construction time from the supplied plans as 700 hours.

Operational history
By 1998 the company reported that 40 sets of plans had been sold and one aircraft was flying.

Specifications (Ultrababy)

References

Ultrababy
1990s United States sport aircraft
1990s United States ultralight aircraft
Single-engined tractor aircraft
Low-wing aircraft
Homebuilt aircraft